Jong Su-hyok (born April 30, 1987) is a North Korean footballer who plays as a midfielder.

References 

Living people
1987 births
North Korean footballers
North Korea international footballers
Footballers at the 2006 Asian Games
Association football midfielders
Asian Games competitors for North Korea